Shadow Offering is the fourth studio album by Canadian experimental pop/art rock band Braids. It was originally slated to be released on April 24, 2020, but was delayed to June 19 of that year due to the COVID-19 pandemic.

The album was produced by former Death Cab for Cutie guitarist Chris Walla.

Critical reception

Shadow Offering was met with generally favorable reviews from critics. At Metacritic, which assigns a weighted average rating out of 100 to reviews from mainstream publications, this release received an average score of 78, based on 13 reviews. Aggregator Album of the Year gave the album 75 out of 100 based on a critical consensus of 15 reviews.

Accolades

Track listing

References

2020 albums
Secret City Records albums
Braids (band) albums